Jairo Velasco may refer to:

Jairo Velasco, Sr. (born 1947), Colombian-born tennis player
Jairo Velasco, Jr. (born 1974), his son, Spanish tennis player